Dick James may refer to:
 Dick James (1920–1986), British music publisher and singer
 Dick James (American football) (1934–2000), American football player
 Dick James (civil servant), UK citizen who was Director General of the Pacific Islands Forum Fisheries Agency